Mike McGill (born 1964) is an American skateboarder who is best known for inventing the trick entitled the "McTwist", an inverted 540 degree mute grab aerial.

Professional skateboarding

McTwist
A McTwist is a transitional trick that was invented by McGill and consists of a front flip combined with a 540-degree rotation. McGill first performed the manoeuvre on a wooden half-pipe in Rättvik, Sweden in 1984 and then at the Del Mar Skate Ranch's concrete bowl, called The Keyhole, when he returned to the United States (U.S.). McGill was inspired by Fred Blood, who had performed a 540 on roller skates, and only a small number of professionals could successfully complete the trick at the time of its invention—Lester Kasai was the second skateboarder to successfully land the McTwist after McGill. McGill recounted his experience in Sweden in a 2004 Thrasher article:

“Okay,” I thought, “if I could just get past the 400-degree mark I could bail out to my knees and not land on my head.” After a couple dozen tries it happened and I landed one with speed, just like that ... Before long everybody showed up, saying, “Okay, let’s see it.” So I did, but it wasn’t half-way up the wall as they all suspected; it was about four-feet out, which was actually easier for me to see what I was doing. Lance [Mountain] proceeded to grab his skate stuff and did a full body jar with his body over the coping trying it. The next day he took a sequence of it with a single shot camera for the Bones Brigade Intelligence Report, and made me do it 27 times in the same spot. Rodney Mullen then named it the McTwist.

The trick is derived from a combination of the "Mc" in McGill and the word "twist"—twist had previously been introduced by Lance Mountain and Neil Blender, with their invention of the "Gay twist" (a mute-grab, fakie 360-degree aerial). Inspired by the McTwist, McGill's teammate Tony Hawk invented a 720-degree aerial—a double Gay twist—and, as a homage to McGill, named it the "McHawk". The trick was groundbreaking when it was first executed and continues to be performed in the 21st century—snowboarding has also adopted the trick and Shaun White was filmed performing a double McTwist on a snowboard at the 2010 Vancouver Winter Olympics.

Bones Brigade
McGill was a member of the "Bones Brigade", an elite team of skateboarders that was sponsored by Powell Peralta, who dominated professional skateboarding (in both contests and popularity stakes) for a large part of the 1980s. Led by Stacey Peralta, the team also consisted of Lance Mountain, Tony Hawk, Rodney Mullen, Tommy Guerrero, and Steve Caballero.

McGill appeared with Peralta and other Bones Brigades members during the 2012 promotional screenings of the Peralta-directed Bones Brigade documentary, Bones Brigade: An Autobiography. The documentary premiered at the Sundance film festival and a trailer was released in January 2012.

Post-Bones Brigade
McGill mainly skated vertical, and when street skating began to dominate the industry, McGill turned to the business side of skating. He started his own skateboard company, "Chapter Seven" (which is now defunct), and opened his own skate park. As of 2012, he owns a skate shop in Encinitas, California McGills Skateshop, as well as marketing a line of beginners' skateboards, safety equipment and portable skate ramps, rails, and Air Speed skate shoes through Wal-Mart.

Contest history

All contest results are covered in Thrasher Magazine and can be checked at the Thrasher Magazine Archives.

Media
In 2006 McGill was featured in a commercial for the Discovery Channel as the inventor of the McTwist. McGill has also teamed up with Powell Peralta and reissued his signature boards from the 1980s. He continues to skateboard.

In popular culture
Along with Rodney Mullen, McGill was the stunt double for Christian Slater in Gleaming the Cube. He also had an acting role as Tommy 'D' in the 1984 Jimmy McNichol action movie Escape from El Diablo, together with fellow skateboarder Steve Caballero.

OPM's song, "Heaven Is a Halfpipe", references McGill's trick skills with the lines, "I'm gonna twist out like Mike McGill, I'm gonna twist out cos I've got the skills".

Additionally, the Beastie Boys song "B-Boys Makin with the Freak Freak" has a line alluding to McGill "Now let me introduce myself on this cut; I'm AD Rock I'm lit, like a motherfuck; Well I'm brewin' up rhymes like I was usin' a still; I've got an old school flow like Mike McGill"

References

External links
Bones Brigade
1984, Skate Fate zine Issue 39; editor G.S.D announces 1st successful McTwist as a breakthrough move. . . years in the making. / Ragged Edge Collection @ archive.org

1964 births
American skateboarders
Living people
Place of birth missing (living people)